Michal Dudek (born 20 September 1990) is a Czech motorcycle speedway rider and member of the Czech junior national team.

Career details

World Championships 
 Individual U-21 World Championship
 2008 - 16th place in the Qualifying Round 3
 2009 - 15th place in the Qualifying Round 4
 Team U-21 World Championship (U-21 Speedway World Cup)
 2009 -  Gorzów Wlkp. - the Final will be on 5 September (started in the Semi-Final)

European Championships 

 Individual U-19 European Championship
 2008 - 13th place in the Semi-Final 1
 2009 -  Tarnów - 16th place (0 pts)
 Team U-19 European Championship
 2008 - 4th place in the Semi-Final 2
 2009 -  Holsted - 4th place (2 pts)

See also 
 Czech Republic national speedway team

World Longtrack Championship

Qualifying Round
 2015 (13th) 4pts
 2017 (20th) 5pts

Team Championship
 2015  Mühldorf (6th) 3/30pts (Rode with Richard Wolff, Josef Franc, Michal Skurla).
 2017  Roden (4th) 0/43pts (Rode with Hynek Stichauer, Josef Franc).

European Grasstrack Championship

Semi-final
 2017 (16th) 7pts
 2018 (18th) 1pt

References 

Czech speedway riders
1990 births
Living people
Individual Speedway Long Track World Championship riders